Green Fire is a 1954 American drama film.

Green Fire may also refer to:

Film
 Green Fire, a 2012 documentary by Center for Humans and Nature
 Green Fire, an award of the San Francisco Green Film Festival

Literature
 Green Fire (novel), a 1928 American science fiction novel by John Taine
 Green Fire, a 1986 romance novel by Jayne Ann Krentz writing as Stephanie James
 Green Fire, an Ace single volume novel by Anne Maybury
 Green Fire, a 1946 Armed Service Edition by Peter W. Rainier
 "The Green Fire" or Het Groene Vuur", a 1965 comic story featuring Adhemar
 Green Fire Times, a newspaper in New Mexico

Other uses
 Green Fire, a Thoroughbred racehorse that won the 1924 Greenham Stakes
 Green Fire, a public artwork in San Diego by Robert Verhees
 "Green Fire", a 1954 song by Joe Leahy from Desiree
 "Green Fire", a motto of some units of the Kenya Army
 Green fire, a 2007 software bug and in-game plague in World of Warcraft

See also

 Goddess of the Green Fire, a character from The Settlers: Rise of an Empire
 Green Ridge Fire (2020), a 2020 Oregon wildfire
 The Green Inferno (disambiguation)
 Teenage Mutant Ninja Turtles/Flaming Carrot: The Land of Green Fire, a 1993 intercompany crossover comic book series